The Sydney Institute is a privately funded Australian policy forum founded in 1989. The institute took over the resources of the Sydney Institute of Public Affairs which ceased activity in the late 1980s.

The institute was opened on 23 August 1989 by then New South Wales Premier Nick Greiner with supporting remarks from Bob Carr (then NSW Opposition Leader).

Columnist and writer Gerard Henderson is the executive director of the institute. His wife, Anne Henderson, who is also an author, is the deputy director.

The Sydney Institute has been described as a "right-aligned policy think tank", comparable to organizations such as the American Enterprise Institute and the Manhattan Institute.

Gerard and Anne Henderson had previously run the South Australian branch of the Institute of Public Affairs, and run foul of the state Minister for Health who banned cigarette advertising. He branded South Australia as the "nanny state".

The couple then shifted to Sydney where they set up the IPA's New South Wales branch. 

However the Centre for International Studies had shared publishing resources and a territorial agreement with the Melbourne-based Institute of Public Affairs not to infringe on each other's sources of corporate donations, so the Henderson's created their own institute, and Philip Morris was happy to contribute to both.  All these organisations are part of the Atlas Network.

Activities 

The institute holds weekly forums and an annual dinner at which a lecture is given by a person who has been deemed to have made an important contribution in a particular field at either an international or national level. From time to time the institute organises and hosts international conferences; addresses to the institute are published in The Sydney Papers. The institute also publishes The Sydney Institute Quarterly.

Gerard Henderson writes a regular weekly column for The Sydney Morning Herald and The West Australian. Henderson also comments on public radio and appears occasionally on the ABC TV Insiders programs.

Speakers at the Sydney Institute have included Australian Treasurer Joe Hockey, former prime ministers Kevin Rudd, John Howard, Malcolm Turnbull and Scott Morrison, former Opposition Leader Kim Beazley, Nobel Prize recipient Peter C. Doherty, General Peter Cosgrove, former Reserve Bank Governor Ian Macfarlane, former Chief Justice Murray Gleeson and writer David Malouf.

International figures such as Dick Cheney, Jung Chang, William Shawcross, James A. Kelly, Alexander Dubček, John Ralston Saul and Tariq Ali have also given lectures.

Key figures 
The institute has cited the following key figures in the organization:

 Jacquelynne Willcox - Chair
 Amy Menere - Deputy Chair
 Simon Edwards - Treasurer
 Louise Clegg - Board Member
 Joe Gersh AM - Board Member
 George Karagiannakis - Board Member
 Nicholas Johnson - Board Member
 Carmel Mulhearn - Board Member
 Katherine O'Regan - Board Member
 Tony Warren - Board Member
 Mike Zorbas - Board Member

References

External links
The Sydney Institute website
The Sydney Institute podcast

Think tanks based in Australia
Organisations based in Sydney
1989 establishments in Australia